Amt Friesack is an Amt ("collective municipality") in the district of Havelland, in Brandenburg, Germany. Its seat is in Friesack.

The Amt Friesack consists of the following municipalities:
Friesack
Mühlenberge
Paulinenaue
Pessin
Retzow
Wiesenaue

Demography

References 

Friesack
Havelland (district)